The Roman Catholic Diocese of Pekhon (Dioecesis Pekhonensis) is located in the Pekhon, Shan State in Myanmar. It is a suffragan diocese of the Archdiocese of Taunggyi.

The diocese was created on December 15, 2005, by splitting off the territory from the Archdiocese of Taunggyi. Peter Hla, who was previously auxiliary bishop of Taunggyi, was selected as its first bishop. The cathedral of the diocese is the church of Sacred Heart in Pekhon.

References

External links
 Catholic-hierarchy.org
 Vatican press release on the creation

Roman Catholic dioceses in Burma
Christian organizations established in 2005
Roman Catholic dioceses and prelatures established in the 21st century